The men's épée was one of seven fencing events on the fencing at the 1932 Summer Olympics programme. It was the eighth appearance of the event. The competition was held from 8 August 1932 to 9 August 1932. 28 fencers from 12 nations competed, with three others entered but not starting. A maximum of three fencers per nation could compete. The event was won by Giancarlo Cornaggia-Medici of Italy, with his countryman Carlo Agostoni taking bronze. They were the first medals for Italy in the men's individual épée. France reached the podium for the fourth consecutive Games in the event with Georges Buchard's silver. Buchard was the third man to win multiple medals in the event, repeating his second-place finish from 1928.

Background
This was the eighth appearance of the event, which was not held at the first Games in 1896 (with only foil and sabre events held) but has been held at every Summer Olympics since 1900.

Two of the 10 finalists from the 1928 Games returned: silver medalist (and 1924 finalist) Georges Buchard of France and bronze medalist George Calnan of the United States. Buchard was the reigning (1931) World Champion; he had also won in 1927 and would win again in 1933. He and fellow French fencer Philippe Cattiau, the 1929 and 1930 World Champion, were the favorites in the event. 

For the first time, no nations made their debut in the event. Belgium and the United States each appeared for the seventh time, tied for most among nations.

Competition format

The competition format continued the pool play round-robin from prior years, but increased the number of touches to win a bout to 3. With fewer fencers than in prior Games, the number of rounds was reduced from four to three. A point system was used, with 2 points for a win, 1 point for a tie, and 0 points for a loss. The total number of touches received was used as the first tie-breaker. Touches scored was used as the second in the final. It also was apparently used in the earlier rounds for the most part, though the official placing for 8th and 9th in round 1 pool 1 is inconsistent.

 Quarterfinals: 3 pools of between 9 and 11 fencers each. The top 7 fencers in the first two pools (each scheduled to have 11 fencers) and the top 6 fencers in the third pool (scheduled to have 9 fencers) advanced to the semifinals. 
 Semifinals: 2 pools of 10 fencers each. The top 6 fencers in each pool advanced to the final.
 Final: 1 pool of 12 fencers.

Schedule

Results

Quarterfinals

The top 7 finishers in pools 1 and 2 and the top 6 finishers in pool 3 advanced to the semifinals.

Quarterfinal 1

It is unclear why Markus is ranked ahead of Corbin; being equal on points and touches received, Corbin's touches scored should have ranked him higher.

Quarterfinal 2

5 bouts in the round-robin were skipped (Agostini-Schmetz, Agostini-Saucedo, Saucedo-de Graffenried, Poplimont-Calnan, and Poplimont-Petneházy).

The Official Report lists the bout between Farrell and Delgadillo as 2–2, but Sports-Reference reports a 3–2 Farrell win. The latter is consistent with Farrell having 7 points, as reported in both sources, and Delgadillo having 4, as listed in Sports-Reference. The Official Report lists Delgadillo as having 6 points, which is inconsistent with either a tie or loss. Both sources, however, list Delgadillo as having received 26 touches; if the result of the bout was 3–2 for Farrell, this number should be 27.

The Official Report does not explain why Lindman advanced to the semifinals rather than Farrell.

Quarterfinal 3

Semifinals

The top six finishers in each semifinal advanced to the final.

Semifinal 1

Two bouts were not played: De Beukelaer-de Jong and Cattiau-Saucedo.

Both the Official Report and Sports-Reference credit De Beukelaer with 10 points; however, the head-to-head data shown by each has him winning 6 bouts and losing 2, which should result in 12 points.

Semifinal 2

Final

Results summary

References

Epee men
Men's events at the 1932 Summer Olympics